The 1979 Vanderbilt Commodores football team represented Vanderbilt University in the 1978 NCAA Division I-A football season. The Commodores were led by head coach George MacIntyre in his first season and finished the season with a record of one win and ten losses (1–10 overall, 0–6 in the SEC).

Schedule

Source: 1979 Vanderbilt football schedule

Personnel

Season summary

at Tennessee

References

Vanderbilt
Vanderbilt Commodores football seasons
Vanderbilt Commodores football